"My Dawg" is the debut single by American rapper Lil Baby. It was released on July 13, 2017, as the lead single from his mixtape Harder Than Hard. The song peaked at number 71 on the Billboard Hot 100.

Music video 
The music video for the track was released on July 18, 2017. The video includes a clip from the 1993 film Menace II Society.

Remix 
A remix of the track, featuring new guest verses from Quavo, Moneybagg Yo, and Kodak Black, was released on December 5, 2017. The remix was later included on the compilation album Control the Streets, Volume 1 by record label Quality Control.

Critical reception 
Michael Saponara of Billboard ranked the track the second best in Lil Baby's discography, calling it a "triumphant anthem". Robby Seabrook III of XXL called the track "infectious". Mitch Findlay of HotNewHipHop said the track had a "catchy melody" and called it "hypnotic".

Charts

Certifications

References

2017 debut singles
2017 songs
Lil Baby songs
Songs written by Lil Baby
Song recordings produced by Quay Global
Songs written by Quay Global